Sergeant James H. Burbank (January 5, 1838 – February 15, 1911) was a Dutch soldier who fought in the American Civil War. Burbank received the United States' highest award for bravery during combat, the Medal of Honor, for his action at Blackwater, near Franklin, Virginia on 3 October 1862. He was honored with the award on 27 July 1896.

Biography
Burbank was born as Reinder Jilderts in Stavoren, Friesland in the Netherlands on 5 January 1838 and migrated to the United States. He enlisted into the 1st Rhode Island Volunteers on 16 April 1861 at Providence, Rhode Island. He was promoted to second sergeant and later served as a non-commissioned first sergeant. Burbank served an 11-month stint with the navy, on detached service. It was during this service that he performed the act of gallantry that earned him the medal of honor. On October 1862 he was aboard the Commodore Perry at Black Water, near Franklin, Virginia. He served with outstanding bravery despite heavy fire and despite thirteen shots piercing his coat.

Following the war Burbank married Mary A. Burns, who had emigrated from Glasgow, Scotland, and they resided in Rhode Island. He subsequently moved to Missouri and then Kansas. Their marriage produced seven children.

Medal of Honor citation

See also

List of American Civil War Medal of Honor recipients: A–F

References

1838 births
1911 deaths
American Civil War recipients of the Medal of Honor
Dutch emigrants to the United States
Foreign-born Medal of Honor recipients
People of Rhode Island in the American Civil War
Union Army officers
United States Army Medal of Honor recipients
People from Nijefurd